Lunda Wells (born February 10, 1983) is an American football coach who is the tight ends coach of the Dallas Cowboys. Wells is the former tight ends coach of the New York Giants.

Personal life
Wells is married to Tiffany. They have two daughters, Adanya Neema and Zalika Nia.

References

1983 births
Living people
American football offensive guards
Dallas Cowboys coaches
LSU Tigers football coaches
New York Giants coaches
Players of American football from Louisiana
Southern Jaguars football players
People from Baker, Louisiana
Coaches of American football from Louisiana
Southern University alumni
Sportspeople from East Baton Rouge Parish, Louisiana